The L type ordinary chondrites are the second most common group of meteorites, accounting for approximately 35% of all those catalogued, and 40% of the ordinary chondrites. The ordinary chondrites are thought to have originated from three parent asteroids, with the fragments making up the H chondrite, L chondrite and LL chondrite groups respectively.

Name
Their name comes from their relatively low iron abundance, with respect to the H chondrites, which are about 20–25% iron by weight.

Historically, the L chondrites have been named hypersthene chondrites or olivine hypersthene chondrites for the dominant minerals, but these terms are now obsolete.

Chemical composition
Characteristic is the fayalite content (Fa) in olivine of 21 to 25 mol%. About 4–10% iron–nickel is found as a free metal, making these meteorites magnetic, but not as strongly as the H chondrites.

Mineralogy
The most abundant minerals are olivine and hypersthene (an orthopyroxene), as well as iron–nickel and troilite. Chromite, sodium-rich feldspar and calcium phosphates occur in minor amounts. Petrologic type 6 dominates, with over 60% of the L chondrites falling into this class.

Ordovician meteor event
Many of the L chondrite meteors may have their origin in the Ordovician meteor event, radioisotope dated with uranium-lead at around 467.50±0.28 million years ago. Compared to other chondrites, a large proportion of the L chondrites have been heavily shocked, which is taken to imply that the parent body was catastrophically disrupted by a large impact. This impact has been dated via cosmic ray exposure at around 468.0±0.3 million years ago. Earlier argon dating placed the event at around 470±6 million years ago.

Parent body
The parent body/bodies for this group are not known, but plausible suggestions include 433 Eros and 8 Flora, or the Flora family as a whole. 

See also
 Glossary of meteoritics

References

External links 
The Catalogue of Meteorites

fi:L-kondriitti